KCJJ (1630 AM, "The Mighty 1630") is a radio station licensed to Iowa City, Iowa, United States.  The station is owned by Stephen Soboroff's (Steve Bridges) River City Radio, Inc. 

KCJJ broadcasts with 10,000 watts during the day and 1,000 watts at night. It can be heard throughout Eastern Iowa during the day and in many states in the central and eastern United States at night. KCJJ streams at http://1630kcjj.com and on all your devices through the TuneIn app. We stream in studio shows on YouTube.

Programming

KCJJ has a full service format with hot adult contemporary music. The Morning Show is hosted by Captain Steve Bridges, Jim Hunter, Tom Suter, and Pat Harty. Middays are handled by Tommy Lang, and Nights by Molly Suter.  Local News is aired hourly and High School Sports are featured nightly. KCJJ is affiliated with CBS and CNN. The station airs weathercasts from Severestudios.com, the syndicated Lex and Terry Show, The Mike O'Meara Show, and NASCAR auto racing.

History

KCJJ originated as an application for a new station on 1560 kHz in Iowa City, which was filed in 1971 but wasn't issued a construction permit until 1976. The station began regular broadcasting on January 15, 1977.

Expanded Band assignment

On March 17, 1997 the Federal Communications Commission (FCC) announced that 88 stations had been given permission to move to newly available "Expanded Band" transmitting frequencies, ranging from 1610 to 1700 kHz, with KCJJ authorized to move from 1560 kHz to 1630 kHz. A construction permit for the expanded band station was assigned the call letters KCJK on November 10, 1997. On October 23, 1998 the two stations swapped call letters, with AM 1560 changing from KCJJ to KCJK, and AM 1630 changing from KCJK to KCJJ.

FCC policy provided that original stations and their expanded band twins could operate simultaneously for up to five years, after which owners would have to turn in one of the two licenses, depending on whether they preferred the new assignment or elected to remain on the original frequency. It was decided to transfer full operations to the expanded band station, and on May 7, 2002 the license for the original station on 1560 kHz (KCJK), was cancelled, with AM 1630 continuing as KCJJ.

99 Plus KFMH
An Internet-only revival of the original 99.7 KFMH began streaming in March 2013 and is the sister station of KCJJ. 99pluskfmh.com has an Adult Alternative Album format, as it did originally from 1973-1994. Many of the original DJs have returned as has the program Off The Beaten Track, hosted by Roberto Nache. The station streams at http://99pluskfmh.com/ and on devices through the TuneIn app.

References

External links
KCJJ official website
http://streamdb5web.securenetsystems.net/v5/KCJJ
Listen Live

FCC History Cards for KCJJ (covering 1976-1981 on 1560 kHz)

CJJ
News and talk radio stations in the United States
Hot adult contemporary radio stations in the United States
Radio stations established in 1977
1977 establishments in Iowa